Hallodapus rufescens  is a Palearctic species of  true bug

References
 

Miridae
Hemiptera of Europe
Insects described in 1835